SOTP may refer to:

Saturn Orbiter/Titan Probe, later officially named Cassini-Huygens
Sex Offender Treatment Program, a program used to prevent recidivism in sex offenders
"Scared of the Police", a song by the British rock band Reuben
The Sisterhood of the Traveling Pants, a book series and later a film franchise
State of the Province address, a speech given by a provincial commander-in-chief; similar to the State of the State address for a state's commander-in-chief
Sum-of-the-parts analysis, a method of company valuation

See also

 
 STP (disambiguation)
 SOP (disambiguation)
 SP (disambiguation)